The Yixing Pumped Storage Power Station is a pumped-storage hydroelectric power station located Yixing city of Jiangsu Province, China. Construction on the power station began in 2003 and the first unit was commissioned in 2007, the last in 2008. The entire project cost US$490 million, of which US$145 million was provided by the World Bank. The power station operates by shifting water between an upper and lower reservoir to generate electricity. The lower reservoir was formed with the existing Huiwu Dam at the foot of Mount Tongguan. During periods of low energy demand, such as at night, water is pumped from Huiwu Lower Reservoir up to the upper reservoir. When energy demand is high, the water is released back down to the lower reservoir but the pump turbines that pumped the water up now reverse mode and serve as generators to produce electricity. Water from the nearby Huangtong River can also be pumped into the lower reservoir to augment storage. The process is repeated as necessary and the plant serves as a peaking power plant. The power station is operated by East China Yixing Pumped Storage Co Ltd.

The upper reservoir is created by two dams that form a semi-circle on the mountain top. Water from the upper reservoir is sent to the  underground power station down near the lower reservoir through  of headrace/penstock pipes.

See also

List of pumped-storage power stations

References

Energy infrastructure completed in 2008
Dams in China
Pumped-storage hydroelectric power stations in China
Concrete-face rock-fill dams
Rock-filled dams
Hydroelectric power stations in Jiangsu
Roller-compacted concrete dams
2008 establishments in China
Gravity dams
Underground power stations